The 2013 Campeonato Paraibano de Futebol was the 103rd edition of the Paraíba's top professional football league. The competition began on January 06, and ended on May 30. Botafogo won the championship by the 26th time. while Paraíba and Cruzeiro were relegated.

Format
In the first stage all teams except Campinense and Sousa played against each other twice. The six best teams advanced to the second stage, and the two worst teams were relegated. Also, the two best teams qualified for the final stage, but they still had to play the second stage.

In the second stage, the six teams were joined by Campinense and Sousa. All teams played against each other twice. The two best teams advanced to the final stage.

The four teams in the final stage played the semifinals, with the winners of each match contesting the final.

Qualifications
The champion qualified for the 2014 Copa do Brasil. The best team who isn't on Campeonato Brasileiro Série A, Série B and Série C qualified for the 2013 Campeonato Brasileiro Série D. The two best teams qualified for the 2014 Copa do Nordeste.

Participating teams

First stage

Standings

Results

Second stage
The six teams from first stage are joined by Campinense and Sousa.

Standings

Results

Final stage

Semifinals

First leg

Second leg

Finals

Botafogo is the champion of the 2013 Campeonato Paraibano.

References

Paraibano
2013